Boffa may refer to:
Boffa, Guinea, a town and sub-prefecture in Guinea
Boffa Prefecture, a prefecture in the Boké Region of Guinea
Boffa Island, an Antarctic island
people with the surname Boffa, see Boffa (surname)